The Embassy of Bulgaria in Kyiv is the diplomatic mission of Bulgaria in Ukraine.

In 2022, the embassy was temporarily closed due to the Russian invasion of Ukraine. In September 2022, the Embassy of Bulgaria resumed its work in Kyiv.

Consulate General of the Republic of Bulgaria 
 Consulate General of the Republic of Bulgaria in Odesa, Address: Posmitnyy St., 9, Odesa 65062, Ukraine
 Consulate General of the Republic of Bulgaria in Zaporizhia, Address: Khortytsia, 55, Zaporizhia 69017, Ukraine

Previous Ambassadors
 Ivan Shishmanov (1918-1919)
 Dimitar Tserov (1992), Chargé d'Affaires ad interim
 Peter Markov (1992-1998)
 Alexander Dimitrov (1998-2002)
 Angel Ganev (2002-2007)
 Dimitar Vladimirov (2007-2012)
 Krasimir Minchev (2012-2018)
 Stoyana Rusinova, Chargé d'Affaires ad interim
 Kostadin Tashev Kodzhabashev (2019-)

See also 
 Bulgaria-Ukraine relations
 Foreign relations of Bulgaria
 Foreign relations of Ukraine
 Embassy of Ukraine, Sofia
 Diplomatic missions in Ukraine
 Diplomatic missions of Bulgaria

References

External links 
 Embassy of Bulgaria in Kyiv 
 The Republic of Bulgaria Ministry of Foreign Affairs
 Ministry of Foreign Affairs of Ukraine

Bulgaria
Kyiv
Bulgaria–Ukraine relations